The M22 is a motorway in County Antrim, Northern Ireland.  It is 5.6 miles (9 km) long and connects the A6 with the M2.   It forms part of the unsigned European route E16.

History
In 1964, the Northern Ireland Government announced plans for an extensive network of motorways. Part of this was an M22 motorway from the M2 near Antrim to Castledawson, County Londonderry. With the increase in civil disorder, known as the Troubles, and the introduction of direct rule, the motorway programme was nearly all cancelled and the M22 was left as it currently stood in 1975.

It was opened in two sections:
Junction 1 to 2 opened in 1971; and
Junction 2 to 3 opened in 1973.
As of May 2019, the A6 from the western end of the M22 to Castledawson is under construction as a dual carriageway.

Route
The motorway starts shortly after junction 7 of the M2 Northwards at the split in the carriageways on the M2 around 1 mile from junction 1 of the M22, where the M2 was to head north towards Ballymena. After meeting junction 1 – the site of the Junction One retail outlet – it continues west across Ferguson's Water, the Belfast-Derry railway line and Mill Burn as it bypasses the suburbs of Antrim to the north. Between junctions 2 and 3 it passes between Randalstown and the Randalstown forest, crosses the River Main, and then ends at junction 3. The M22 is a two-lane dual carriageway throughout its length.

Junctions

See also
Roads in Ireland
List of motorways in the United Kingdom

References

External links 

Roads.org.uk Motorway Database – M22 (Northern Ireland)
Northern Ireland Roads Site – M2/M22

Motorways in Northern Ireland
Roads in County Antrim